Manila is a small unincorporated community in Boone County, West Virginia, United States.  Like other American settlements named for the Philippine capital, the town was so  named circa 1900, during the Spanish–American War, to commemorate the United States' naval victory at the 1898 Battle of Manila Bay.

Its fourth class post office was discontinued on February 28, 1969.

References 

Unincorporated communities in Boone County, West Virginia
Unincorporated communities in West Virginia